Valentini Daskaloudi, born 1979 in Athens, is a Greek fashion model.  During the 2001 Miss Star Hellas pageant she won the title Miss Hellas (Greek: Miss Ελλάς) and was chosen to represent Greece at the Miss World pageant which was held in Sun City, South Africa; 93 contestants participated. Valentini has two diplomas; a Fashion Designer and one for Computer Science. Aside from being a model Valentini is also a dress designer. Valentini is pursuing a modeling career represented by Ace Models Agency, and has appeared on the cover of fashion magazines.

External links
 Ace Models

Greek female models
Living people
1979 births
Miss World 2001 delegates
Greek beauty pageant winners
Models from Athens